Matthew Gwynn is an American politician and law enforcement officer serving as a member of the Utah House of Representatives from the 29th district. Elected in November 2020, he assumed office on January 1, 2021.

Early life and education 
Gwynn was born and raised in Ogden, Utah. He earned a Bachelor of Science degree in political science from Weber State University and a Master of Arts in public policy and administration from Northwestern University.

Career 
Gwynn served in the United States Marine Corps and United States Air Force. From 2001 to 2003, Gwynn was a corrections officer with the Weber County Sheriff's Office. Since 2003, he has been a police officer in Roy, Utah. In June 2021, Gwynn was appointed to serve as police chief of Roy.  Gwynn was also a member of the Farr West, Utah City Council until his election to the Utah House of Representatives.

References 

Living people
People from Ogden, Utah
Weber State University alumni
Northwestern University alumni
People from Roy, Utah
21st-century American politicians
American police officers
Utah city council members
Republican Party members of the Utah House of Representatives
Year of birth missing (living people)